Aneesh Sheth (born January 5, 1982) is an Indian-American actress and transgender activist.

Biography
Aneesh Sheth was born in India, but moved to the United States when she was little. Her parents were "very supportive" of theatrical arts and Sheth chose to pursue a career resulting in acting on stage starting at the age of 7. In 2008, Sheth went through her transition after she chose to help LGBTQ kids by joining The Trevor Project and The Stigma Project. After hearing transgender people speak, Sheth realized that she too was trans and decided to begin the process. On coming out to her family, she faced both support and opposition. "Nearly everyone said that they weren’t surprised. I did experience some loss in certain relationships, but it strengthened some others. You learn that life is short and you don't have time to waste on people who aren't going to fully accept you for who you are."

Her first major acting role was as Kami Sutra in the short lived NBC sitcom Outsourced. She only appeared in 2 episodes, but considered it a turning point in her career stating, "I should not limit myself because of who I am". Sheth was cast as Gillian in the third and final season of Jessica Jones, which is part of the highly successful Marvel Cinematic Universe franchise. She liked that her character being trans was not a major issue and was treated like a regular thing adding, "there’s no mention of [Gillian] being trans within the show, nor a narrative around her identity. Which I think is wonderful because trans people exist in the world and it’s not always about their [trans] narrative."

Filmography

References

External links

1982 births
Living people
21st-century American actresses
21st-century Indian actresses
Actresses from Pune
American actresses of Indian descent
American film actresses
American television actresses
Indian film actresses
Indian television actresses
American LGBT people of Asian descent
American LGBT actors
Indian LGBT actors
Transgender actresses
20th-century Indian LGBT people
21st-century Indian LGBT people